William Blumberg and Max Schnur were the defending champions but only Blumberg chose to defend his title, partnering Keegan Smith. Blumberg lost in the first round to Nick Chappell and Alex Michelsen.

Robert Galloway and Hans Hach Verdugo won the title after defeating Ruben Gonzales and Reese Stalder 3–6, 7–5, [10–6] in the final.

Seeds

Draw

References

External links
 Main draw

Cleveland Open - Doubles